The 2010–11 Colorado State Rams men's basketball team represented Colorado State University. The team was coached by Tim Miles in his 4th season. They played their home games at the Moby Arena on Colorado State University's main campus in Fort Collins, Colorado and are a member of the Mountain West Conference. They finished the season 19–13, 9–7 in Mountain West play and lost in the quarterfinals of the 2011 Mountain West Conference men's basketball tournament to New Mexico. They were invited to the 2011 National Invitation Tournament which they lost in the first round to Fairfield.

Roster

Preview 
The Rams were picked to finish fifth in the Mountain West Conference, behind defending conference tournament champion San Diego State Aztecs, the BYU Cougars led by preseason player of the year (Jimmer Fredette), the New Mexico Lobos and the UNLV Rebels. Colorado State received a fifth-place vote and 135 points.

Tim Miles Extension Contract 
During the off season, it was announced that Tim Miles has extended his contract to 2015–2016 year.

Schedule and results 

|-
!colspan=9| Exhibition

|-
!colspan=9| Regular season

|-
!colspan=9| 2011 Mountain West Conference men's basketball tournament

|-
!colspan=9| 2011 National Invitation Tournament

See also 
 2010–11 NCAA Division I men's basketball season
 2010–11 NCAA Division I men's basketball rankings

References 

Colorado State
Colorado State Rams men's basketball seasons
Colorado State
Colorado State Rams
Colorado State Rams